Cezary Siess (born 15 March 1968) is a Polish fencer. He won a bronze medal in the team foil event at the 1992 Summer Olympics.

References

1968 births
Living people
Polish male fencers
Olympic fencers of Poland
Fencers at the 1988 Summer Olympics
Fencers at the 1992 Summer Olympics
Olympic bronze medalists for Poland
Olympic medalists in fencing
Sportspeople from Gdańsk
Medalists at the 1992 Summer Olympics